Tommy Brunner (1970 in Innsbruck – 21 April 2006 in Bella Coola, British Columbia, Canada) was an Austrian big mountain snowboarding legend. He died in an avalanche in April 2006, just 2 weeks after the release of a computer game by Bongfish Interactive Entertainment dedicated to him called Stoked Rider.

External links 
 Information about Stoked Rider
 Tommy Brunner Passed Away, Snowboard magazine

Austrian male snowboarders
1970 births
2006 deaths
Deaths in avalanches
Natural disaster deaths in Canada
Accidental deaths in British Columbia